Sofiane Khelili (born December 9, 1989) is an Algerian footballer who plays as a centre back for  Al-Nasr.

Club career
On January 22, 2011, Khelili signed a three-year contract with JS Kabylie, joining them on a transfer from NA Hussein Dey. JS Kabylie paid a transfer fee of 6,000,000 Algerian dinars. On March 4, 2011, Khelili made his official debut for JS Kabylie in a 2010–11 Algerian Cup match against ES Mostaganem. Khelili came on as a substitute in the 89th minute as JS Kabylie won 1–0.

On 12 August 2021, Khelili joined Ohod.

On 11 January 2023, Khelili joined Al-Sharq.

International career
On October 1, 2008, Khelili was called up to the Algerian Under-23 National Team for the first time for a 5-day training camp in Algiers. He was a member of the Under-23 team that won the 2010 UNAF U-23 Tournament in Morocco. On November 16, 2011, he was selected as part of Algeria's squad for the 2011 CAF U-23 Championship in Morocco.

Honours
 Won the Algerian Cup once with JS Kabylie in 2011
 Won the World Military Cup once with the Algerian National Military Team in 2011

References

External links
 DZFoot Profile
 
 Sofiane Khelili at Footballdatabase

1989 births
Living people
Algerian footballers
Algeria under-23 international footballers
JS Kabylie players
NA Hussein Dey players
Ettifaq FC players
CR Belouizdad players
USM El Harrach players
JSM Skikda players
US Ben Guerdane players
NC Magra players
Ohod Club players
Al-Nasr SC (Benghazi) players
Al-Sharq Club players
Algerian Ligue 2 players
Algerian Ligue Professionnelle 1 players
Saudi Professional League players
Tunisian Ligue Professionnelle 1 players
Saudi First Division League players
Libyan Premier League players
Saudi Second Division players
2011 CAF U-23 Championship players
Algeria youth international footballers
Algerian expatriate footballers
Association football defenders
Expatriate footballers in Saudi Arabia
Algerian expatriate sportspeople in Saudi Arabia
Expatriate footballers in Tunisia
Algerian expatriate sportspeople in Tunisia
Expatriate footballers in Libya
Algerian expatriate sportspeople in Libya
21st-century Algerian people